John Anthony Boyle (March 22, 1866 – January 7, 1913), nicknamed "Honest Jack", was an American catcher and first baseman in Major League Baseball. His younger brother, Eddie Boyle, played in 1896.

Baseball career
Born in Cincinnati, Boyle began his professional baseball career in 1886, playing in one game for the Cincinnati Red Stockings of the American Association. On November 12, 1886, he was traded, along with $350, to the St. Louis Browns in exchange for Hugh Nicol.

In 1887, Boyle caught only a couple of games until July 3.  Although some sources credit Boyle with having caught 87 straight games, the correct statistic is 43 straight games--after that he played right field, ending his then-record streak.

Boyle accompanied Charles Comiskey to the Chicago Pirates of the Players' League team in 1890 and returned with him to St. Louis the following year. In 1892, Boyle signed with the New York Giants for $5,500. 
 
After one season with New York, Boyle was traded, with Jack Sharrott and cash, on March 11, 1893, to the Philadelphia Phillies in exchange for Roger Connor.  Boyle spent the next five years as a catcher and first baseman for the Phillies.  On July 9, 1898, he was sold by Philadelphia to the Giants for $1,000.  However, he did not play a single game for them and was returned to Philadelphia on August 15, 1898.

A well-respected and versatile fielder, Boyle played every position but pitcher during his major league career.   One of only four major league players to have played 500 games at catcher and had at least two seasons with 100 games or more at first base (with Joe Mauer, Joe Torre and Gene Tenace), he has been described as a "19th-century multi-position sensation".

Popular with fans and teammates, Boyle captained the Phillies in the mid-1890s.  He also served as an umpire in the National League (4 games) and American Association (1 game) between 1888 and 1897. 

The origins of Boyle's nickname are uncertain.  It has been proposed that "Honest Jack" refers to his candor with his teammates and the press, or that it was originally bestowed by his teammates to distinguish him from his fellow catcher "Dirty" Jack Doyle when they both played for the Giants.

Later life
Boyle opened a saloon in the Ohio River city on Seventh Street.

In 1913, Boyle died at his home in Cincinnati at the age of 46.  He was interred at the St. Joseph New Cemetery in Cincinnati.

See also
List of Major League Baseball single-game hits leaders

References

External links

BaseballLibrary.com

 Jack Boyle at SABR (Baseball BioProject)

1866 births
1913 deaths
19th-century baseball players
Major League Baseball catchers
Major League Baseball first basemen
Cincinnati Red Stockings (AA) players
St. Louis Browns (AA) players
Chicago Pirates players
New York Giants (NL) players
Philadelphia Phillies players
Minor league baseball managers
Terre Haute Hottentots players
Kansas City Blues (baseball) players
Baseball players from Cincinnati
Deaths from nephritis